17473 Freddiemercury, provisional designation , is a stony Massalian asteroid from the inner regions asteroid belt, approximately 3.4 kilometers in diameter. The asteroid was discovered on 21 March 1991, by Belgian astronomer Henri Debehogne at ESO's La Silla Observatory in northern Chile, and later named in memory of Freddie Mercury.

Classification and orbit 

Freddiemercury is a member of the Massalia family, a large family of stony S-type asteroids with low inclinations in the inner main belt. It orbits the Sun at a distance of 2.0–2.8 AU once every 3 years and 8 months (1,350 days). Its orbit has an eccentricity of 0.16 and an inclination of 1° with respect to the ecliptic.

Physical characteristics 

According to the survey carried out by the NEOWISE mission of NASA's Wide-field Infrared Survey Explorer, Freddiemercury measures 3.4 kilometers in diameter and its surface has a high albedo of 0.313.

As of 2017, the asteroid's exact composition, as well as its rotation period and shape remain unknown.

Naming 

On 4 September 2016, one day before what would have been Freddie Mercury's 70th birthday, the International Astronomical Union and the Minor Planet Center named the asteroid after Mercury, as it was discovered the same year as Mercury's death, and its provisional designation included his initials, FM. The approved naming was announced by Mercury's Queen bandmate Brian May at Montreux Casino to mark Mercury's 70th birthday.

References

External links 
 Asteroid Lightcurve Database (LCDB), query form (info )
 Dictionary of Minor Planet Names, Google books
 Asteroids and comets rotation curves, CdR – Observatoire de Genève, Raoul Behrend
 Discovery Circumstances: Numbered Minor Planets (15001)-(20000) – Minor Planet Center
 Asteroid (17473) Freddiemercury: an image  – Virtual Telescope Project
 
 

017473
Discoveries by Henri Debehogne
Named minor planets
Freddie Mercury
19910321